This is a list of Dutch television related events from 1965.

Events
13 February - Conny Vandenbos is selected to represent Netherlands at the 1965 Eurovision Song Contest with her song "'t Is genoeg". She is selected to be the tenth Dutch Eurovision entry during Nationaal Songfestival held at Concordia Theatre in Bussum.

Debuts

Television shows

1950s
NOS Journaal (1956–present)
Pipo de Clown (1958-1980)

1960s
Stiefbeen en Zoon (1964-1971)

Ending this year

Births
17 April - Joris Lutz, actor & TV presenter
26 October - Humberto Tan, TV & radio presenter & writer

Deaths